South Grant was an electoral district of the Legislative Assembly in the Australian state of Victoria from 1856 to 1877.

South Grant was based in the countryside surrounding (but not including) Geelong, bordered on the north and east by the Werribee River, on the west by the Yarrowee River and the coastline to current-day Anglesea.

The district of South Grant was one of the initial districts of the first Victorian Legislative Assembly, 1856.

Members for South Grant
Three members were elected to the district.

      # = won seat in by-election
 = seat forfeited

References

Former electoral districts of Victoria (Australia)
1856 establishments in Australia
1877 disestablishments in Australia